Arthur Walters may refer to:

 Arthur Melmoth Walters (1865–1941), British footballer
 Arthur Scott Walters (born 1943), American physician